The Hoya, founded in 1920, is the oldest and largest student newspaper of Georgetown University in Washington, D.C., serving as the university’s newspaper of record. The Hoya is a student-run paper that prints every Friday and publishes online daily throughout the year, with a print circulation of 4,000 during the academic year. The newspaper has four main editorial sections: News, Opinion, Sports and The Guide, a weekly arts and lifestyle magazine. It also publishes several annual special issues including a New Student Guide, a basketball preview and a semesterly fashion issue.

Although The Hoya is not financially independent from the university, it is produced, managed and edited entirely by students and maintains editorial independence. Over 300 students are involved in the publication of the paper.

History

Founding 

{{Blockquote
|text=Blushing as coyly as any schoolgirl, and with the excited fears and hopes of a debutante … we lay this first edition of The Hoya at the feet of the student body, and retreat to a safe distance to observe the effects.
|author=Joseph R. Mickler, Jr
|source=The Hoya'''s debut issue
}}

The first issue of The Hoya was published on January 14, 1920, under the editorship of Joseph R. Mickler, Jr. Student journalism at Georgetown can be traced as far back as 1824 and the appearance of a hand-copied publication titled Minerva. The Hoya, however, was distinguished from previous student publications by its intent to be a comprehensive university newspaper. The publication took its name from the phrase 'Hoya Saxa', which had been adopted as a common chant at Georgetown sports events in the 1890s. The popularity of the term spread as local newspapers often cited the Hoya, and "Hoya" began to be widely applied to campus organizations and to athletic groups themselves.

 First 40 years 
Beginning in the 1940s, the publication shifted its main coverage from athletic to campus events. Weathering the Great Depression, World War II, student unrest in the 1960s and funding cuts in the 1970s, The Hoya has appeared almost continuously since its founding, providing a student perspective on issues and events.

In its early years, The Hoya published once a week, focused mainly on internal, campus affairs, promoting student organizations and school functions, and devoted a large part of its coverage to sports. In 1930, The Hoya received the highest rating given to a college weekly publication by the National Collegiate Press Association.

In the late 1930s, international events began to influence content. The Hoya was one of the few student groups to remain active during the war years, and its pages at this time juxtapose coverage of blood drives, war bond programs and alumni casualties with details of tea dances and intramural athletics.

In the post-war era, the paper's focus returned to internal campus issues, perhaps reflecting the desire of veterans, who made up most of the student body, to return to normal life. The 1950s saw the introduction of two recurring features: the Basketball Preview Issue, which first appeared on December 3, 1957, and the April Fools' issue.

One of the high points of The Hoyas entertainment reporting came in 1964, when one of its reporters managed to interview the Beatles, who were in Washington for their first live concert appearance in the U.S. The interview appeared in the issue of February 20, 1964.

 1970s and Watergate 
In the 1970s, university support for the paper fell significantly; for example, funding was cut more than 55 percent between 1971 and 1975. As a result, the newspaper was forced to increase its advertising fourfold, and full-page advertisements became common. The paper changed its format from tabloid to broadsheet in the fall of 1976. As the Georgetown student body became more diverse, coverage of minority student groups increased, and articles on the activities and concerns of African American and Jewish students appeared.

Women's athletics received more detailed coverage, as did the impact of Title IX, and by the end of the decade, references to "girls" and "hoyettes" had been eliminated from the sports pages. Issues in the spring of 1973 contained coverage of attempts by gay students to organize and obtain official recognition.

The years of 1973 and 1974 saw a number of articles on the Nixon Administration and the Watergate scandal. The coverage of Watergate is possibly linked to the fact that a number of players in the Watergate investigations had Georgetown connections.

In the post-Watergate era, perhaps influenced by the event, The Hoya began to run investigative journalism pieces. As a result, the paper went from being viewed as generally supportive of the administration to being one of the university’s chief antagonists. The spring of 1977 brought perhaps the most significant example of this when a story about the firing of five resident assistants led to a university hearing about the entire residence life system and, ultimately, to the resignation of both a vice president and a dean.

 1980s and expansion 
A number of significant changes to The Hoyas production occurred during the 1980s. The first issue of 1980, produced on January 25, was the first to appear without the approval of a faculty moderator who had previously been a member of the editorial board. And, after six decades of appearing once a week, The Hoya moved to a twice-weekly schedule beginning in the fall of 1987. Other changes included the adoption of the current masthead in 1982 and the development of standard typefaces for headlines and copy.

 1990s to present 
The 1990s saw the consolidation and expansion of The Hoyas entertainment coverage into a pullout arts and lifestyle section titled The Guide. The paper already had a long tradition of providing coverage and reviews of both on-campus and off-campus entertainment, with reviews of off-campus plays and movies first appearing in 1929.

In 1998, The Hoya launched a website. The Hoya also has two official blogs, The Fourth Edition, launched in 2012, which provides a lighthearted take on Georgetown and D.C. news, and Hoya Paranoia, launched in 2008, which covers university athletics throughout the year as well as providing commentary on national and international sports news.The Hoya joined Facebook in 2008 and has been on Twitter since 2009.

In 2017, The Hoya announced its transition into an online-daily format, publishing articles on a daily rather than biweekly basis. In the move to an online format, the paper also reduced its print publication from two issues a week to one, cutting its Tuesday issue while retaining the weekly Friday edition.

Campaign for independence
In 2004, the newspaper began its official bid to gain financial independence from the university. The Hoya receives around $25,000 from Georgetown University for its operation annually. Late in 2004, the newspaper launched a publicity bid to build grassroots support for the proposition; the school seemed willing to allow the paper to split off, but not with the name "The Hoya", which administrators claimed belonged to the school. In 2007, the school filed for a trademark on the name.

The newspaper relaunched the campaign in early 2008 and circulated a petition that gained over 600 signatures from students and alumni. Though this campaign might have been successful, an April Fool's issue in 2009 put a hold on the independence movement. The issue included several articles that were perceived as racist and insensitive. The newspaper faced significant sanctions for the issue. In a Letter from the Editor in the first issue of the fall 2010 semester, The Hoya acknowledged that the notorious April Fools' day issue of 2009 was distasteful, but assured its readers that the newspaper would no longer participate in satirical issues. No April Fools' issues have been published since 2009. The Hoyas Board of Directors voted in 2010 to delay independence until the national economy and the paper's financial situation becomes more favorable.

 Stewards exposé 
In 2013, The Hoya ran a series of pieces as part of an exposé against the Stewards Society. This included a piece on the current student body president candidate who had undisclosed ties to the secret society. This piece would ultimately alter the course of the election outcome and increase scrutiny against the secret society. The Hoya would continue to run pieces on The Stewards' influence on the 2014 and 2015 races.

 2020 and COVID-19 response 
At the onset of the COVID-19 pandemic, The Hoya temporarily paused their print issues and shifted to weekly newsletter-based distribution. The newspaper launched their TikTok account in the fall of 2020, garnering over 150,000 likes on their videos.

 Sections 

 Editorial 
The editorial division is responsible for decisions regarding the content of The Hoya. Two executive editors and the managing editor are selected at the end of the fall and spring semesters and serve for one-semester terms. Senior editors of each section are elected at the end of the fall and spring semesters. Each section’s deputy editors are appointed by the respective senior editor. Senior editors serve one-semester terms at a time, and the editor-in-chief serves for an entire calendar year. The current editor-in-chief is Caitlin McLean.

 Editorial Board 
The Editorial Board is composed of three staff members and three community members, and is chaired by the Senior Opinion Editors. The Editorial Board, which produces The Hoyas editorials, is an autonomous body whose views do not represent the opinions of The Hoya. The currents chairs are Liam McGraw and Ryan Thurz.

 Publishing 
The publishing division manages the business operations. The general manager and departmental directors are hired by the Board of Directors. The current general manager is Aditya Gupte

 Board of Directors 
The Board of Directors oversees the overall strategic direction of the newspaper. The current chair of the board of directors is Jared Carmeli.

AwardsThe Hoya has won several national awards, including:

Associated Collegiate Press National Pacemaker Award, College Newspaper - 2008
Associated Collegiate Press National Pacemaker Award, Online - 2003, 2005

Notable alumni

 Academia 
Leo J. O'Donovan - Former President of Georgetown University
Scott Pilarz - Former President of Marquette University and the University of Scranton
Edward F. Sherman - Professor of law, former dean at Tulane University Law School
Debora Spar - President of Barnard College, member of the board of directors at Goldman Sachs, former professor at Harvard Business School
Mark von Hagen - Professor of history at Arizona State University

 Business 
Andy Billig - Co-owner of the Spokane Indians
Walter Briggs, Jr. - Former owner and general manager of the Detroit Tigers
David Wehner - CFO of Facebook

 Government and politics 
Jeremy Bash - Chief of Staff to Secretary of Defense Leon Panetta
Philip Hart - Former United States Senator from Michigan
Frank Keating - 25th Governor of Oklahoma
Ron Klain - Former Chief of Staff to President Joe Biden, Former Chief of Staff to Vice President Al Gore
Stephen Mull - United States Ambassador to Poland
Pat Quinn - 41st Governor of Illinois

 Media, culture, and entertainment 
Melissa Anelli - Author of Harry, A History, webmaster of The Leaky Cauldron
William Peter Blatty - Author of The Exorcist, winner of the Academy Award for Best Writing (Adapted Screenplay)
Quin Hillyer - Columnist for The American SpectatorMary Jordan - Journalist for The Washington Post, co-winner of the Pulitzer Prize for International Reporting in 2003
Mark Landler - Journalist for The New York Times and Bloomberg BusinessweekJ. D. McClatchy - Editor of The Yale Review, literary critic
Tara McKelvey - Journalist for Newsweek and The Daily BeastDon Murphy - Producer of Natural Born Killers and the films from the Transformers series
Jonathan Nolan - Author of "Memento Mori", co-writer of screenplays for The Dark Knight, The Dark Knight Rises, and InterstellarMiles O'Brien - Science and technology correspondent for CNN
James Johnson Sweeney - Former director of the Solomon R. Guggenheim Museum, former curator for the Museum of Modern Art
Kara Swisher -  Technology columnist for The Wall Street Journal, co-creator of All Things Digital
Matthew VanDyke - Journalist, documentary filmmaker
Gabe Fleisher - Journalist, author of Wake Up To Politics (current student)

 Religion 
Joseph Bernard Brunini - Former Bishop of Jackson
George Henry Guilfoyle - Former Bishop of Camden

 In popular culture 
In The West Wing episode "Take out the Trash Day", Sam Seaborn mentions The Hoya'', which is investigating an allegedly racist sociology professor whose class is attended by First Daughter Zoey Bartlet.

References

External links
Official website
The Fourth Edition blog
The Guide: Creative Writing Issue
The Hoya archives at DigitalGeorgetown
The Hoya archives at the Illinois Digital Newspaper Collections

Hoya
Hoya
Student newspapers published in Washington, D.C.